Alberto Schieppati (born 7 June 1981) is an Italian former alpine skier who competed in the 2006 Winter Olympics.

Biography
In 2021, he replaced Max Blardone, who fell ill with COVID-19, as technical commentator for the men's races of the Cortina 2021 in RAI.

World Cup results

Race podiums
 1 podiums (Giant slalom)

World Championship results
Schiappati finished both times in the top 10 at his two participations in the world championships.

References

External links
 

1981 births
Living people
Italian male alpine skiers
Olympic alpine skiers of Italy
Alpine skiers at the 2006 Winter Olympics
Alpine skiers of Centro Sportivo Carabinieri
Alpine skiers from Milan